Meeting People Is Easy is a 1998 British documentary film by Grant Gee that follows the English rock band Radiohead on the world tour for their 1997 album OK Computer. It received positive reviews and was nominated for a Grammy Award for Best Music Film at the 42nd Annual Grammy Awards in 2000. It sold more than half a million copies on VHS and DVD.

Summary
Meeting People Is Easy documents the promotion and tour for Radiohead's third album, OK Computer, which began on 22 May 1997 in Barcelona, Spain. The film comprises footage of the band working on music, performances (including a performance of "Karma Police" on Late Show with David Letterman), filming promotional material, and giving interviews. It includes footage of the filming of the "No Surprises" music video and the failed studio session for the song "Man of War". The journalist Alex Ross described the film as "a kind of counterstrike against the music press, recording scores of pointless interviews with dead-tired members of the band".

Production
According to the director, Grant Gee, Radiohead sat in hotel suites for days giving interviews. To film each interview, Gee "[ran] around, leaving a microphone in one room, going and filming something in another". He placed surveillance cameras in the band's dressing room, which Gee said foreshadowed the rise of reality television: "We were doing it in a slightly more arty way, but it's the same as Big Brother, what we were doing with that band, seeing them locked in their bubble. Radiohead Big Brother is what I think of that film in a way."

Release
Meeting People Is Easy was released in the UK on VHS on 30 November 1998, and on DVD on 12 June 2000. It was released in both formats on 18 May 1999 in the United States. It was the first DVD released by Radiohead's record label, EMI.

Several television channels broadcast Meeting People Is Easy after its release. In the UK, Channel 4 broadcast the film on 6 May 1999. In the US, MTV broadcast a premiere of the film on 16 May 1999, and the Sundance Channel broadcast the documentary nine times during May 2000.

After Radiohead's new record company, XL, purchased of their back catalogue from EMI in April 2016, Radiohead released Meeting People is Easy free on their website.

Reception
Reviews for Meeting People Is Easy was positive. The film received an average rating of 6.5/10 on Rotten Tomatoes, giving it a 71% "fresh" rating. Reviewer Jessica Brandt of theshrubbery.com gave 5 out of 5 stars. Film critic Daniel Fletcher named Meeting People is Easy one of his ten favourite films. Troy Patterson, a critic for Entertainment Weekly, gave the film B+, calling it "an expressive mood piece creepy with cosmopolitan paranoia and bracingly somber bombast".

Bart Blasengame gave the film four out of five, writing: "Instead of taking the usual tour documentary approach and dwelling on individual concerts or behind-the-scenes banter between the band, Gee's film focuses on the absurdity of being an important rock band in the current musical landscape—the shallow marketing of the band, the endless stream of redundant interviews, the blinding photo shoots and awkward television appearances." Kevin Archibald of IGN gave the film eight out of ten. In 2020, Pitchfork wrote that it "remains a cautionary tale" and wrote that the footage of the "Man of War" recording sessions was a highlight.

The film sold more than half a million copies on DVD and VHS. It was nominated for the "Best Music Film" category at the 2000 Grammy Awards.

Upon reflecting on the film years later, Thom Yorke stated "I’ve never really watched this since it was completed, I couldn’t because it would send me back down a mental hole that would take me days to recover from. But now skimming through it looks kind of funny, sad and alarming at the same time. I still recognize us all. But would have had some strong words for myself at this point."

References

External links
 
 
 Meeting People Is Easy at Kudos Pictures

1998 films
Radiohead
Rockumentaries
British documentary films
Films shot in Barcelona
Films shot in Denmark
Films shot in London
Films shot in New York City
Films shot in Paris
Films shot in Sydney
1990s English-language films
1990s British films